The third USS Ellen (SP-1209) was a United States Navy patrol vessel in commission from 1917 to 1919.

Ellen was built as a civilian motorboat of the same name in 1917 by the Herreshoff Manufacturing Company at Bristol, Rhode Island, one of nine motorboats built to a common design for private owners in anticipation that their owners would make them available for naval service. The U.S. Navy acquired Ellen from her owner on 21 July 1917 for World War I service as a patrol vessel. She was commissioned on 2 August 1917 as USS Ellen (SP-1209).

Ellen operated on section patrol duty for the rest of World War I. She was returned to her owner in April 1919.

Ellen should not be confused with USS Ellen (SP-284), another patrol vessel in commission at the same time.

References
Department of the Navy: Navy History and Heritage Command: Online Library of Selected Images: Civilian Ships: Motor Boat Ellen (1917); Later USS Ellen (SP-1209), 1917–1919
NavSource Online: Section Patrol Craft Photo Archive: Ellen (SP 1209)

Patrol vessels of the United States Navy
World War I patrol vessels of the United States
Ships built in Bristol, Rhode Island
1917 ships